Antonius de Ciudad Rodrigo (died 13 September 1553) was a Roman Catholic prelate who served as the second Bishop of Guadalajara (1552–1553).

Biography
Antonius de Ciudad Rodrigo was ordained a priest in the Order of Friars Minor. In 1552, he was appointed by the King of Spain and confirmed by Pope Julius III as the second Bishop of Guadalajara. He served as Bishop of Guadalajara until his death on 13 September 1553.

References

External links and additional sources
 (for Chronology of Bishops)
 (for Chronology of Bishops)

1553 deaths
Bishops appointed by Pope Julius III
Franciscan bishops
16th-century Roman Catholic bishops in Mexico